Mosaic Publishing was a computer games company founded in 1983 by Vicky Carne, who had previously worked with magazine publisher Haymarket and with Sinclair-Brown, an imprint started by Clive Sinclair and Patrick Brown. Mosaic published a series of best-selling games around licensed product including The Secret Diary of Adrian Mole (based on the similarly named novel by Sue Townsend), Yes, Prime Minister (based on the television series of the same name), The Saga of Erik the Viking, a number of sci-fi titles, and the first soap computer game based on The Archers.

References

Defunct video game companies of the United Kingdom
Video game companies established in 1983